The 1977 Manitoba general election was held on October 11, 1977 to elect Members of the Legislative Assembly of the Province of Manitoba, Canada.  It was won by the Progressive Conservative Party, which took 33 seats out of 57.  The governing New Democratic Party fell to 23 seats, while the Liberal Party won only one seat.

Results

Note:

* Party did not nominate candidates in previous election.

Riding results

Party key:

PC:  Progressive Conservative Party of Manitoba
L:  Manitoba Liberal Party
NDP:  New Democratic Party of Manitoba
SC:  Manitoba Social Credit Party
Comm:  Communist Party of Canada - Manitoba
RWL: Revolutionary Workers League
WDP: Western Democracy Party (see by-elections)
M-L: Marxist–Leninist Party of Canada - Manitoba (see by-elections)
Ind:  Independent

Arthur:

James Downey (PC) 2280
Earl Sterling (NDP) 1172
Murray Lee (L) 901

Assiniboia:

Norma Price (PC) 7863
(incumbent)Stephen Patrick (L) 4271
Max Melnyk (NDP) 2106

Birtle-Russell:

(incumbent)Harry Graham (PC) 3058
Peter Merry (NDP) 2608
Doug MacIsaac (L) 1169

Brandon East:

(incumbent)Leonard Evans (NDP) 4217
James Thornborough (PC) 3195
James Manishen (L) 558

Brandon West:

(incumbent)Edward McGill (PC) 5680
Henry Carroll (NDP) 4601
Phil Cels (L) 807
John Gross (SC) 107

Burrows:

(incumbent)Ben Hanuschak (NDP) 4103
Ken Alyluia (PC) 1688
Anne Percheson (L) 490

Charleswood:

(incumbent)Sterling Lyon (PC) 10559
Maureen Hemphill (NDP) 4216
Beverly Riley (L) 1493

Churchill:

Jay Cowan (NDP) 2280
Mark Ingebrigtson (PC) 1992
Andrew Kirkness (L) 1140

Crescentwood:

(incumbent)Warren Steen (PC) 3253
Muriel Smith (NDP) 3181
Charles Huband (L) 2702

Dauphin:

James Galbraith (PC) 4590
(incumbent)Peter Burtniak (NDP) 4330

Elmwood:

(incumbent)Russell Doern (NDP) 4136
Ken Gunn-Walberg (PC) 3282
Ken Vincent (L) 675

Emerson:

Albert Driedger (PC) 3125
(incumbent)Steve Derewianchuk (NDP) 2153
Gabriel Catellier (L) 1439

Flin Flon:

(incumbent)Thomas Barrow (NDP) 2917
Nyall Hyndman (PC) 2522
Walter Shmon (L) 309

Fort Garry:

(incumbent)Bud Sherman (PC) 10052
Ruth Pear (NDP) 4157
Beth Candlish (L) 2423

Fort Rouge:

(incumbent)Lloyd Axworthy (L) 4153
Julian Hugh McDonald (PC) 3486
Ermano Barone (NDP) 2863

Gimli:

Keith Cosens (PC) 4515
George Schreyer (NDP) 3795

Gladstone:

(incumbent)James Ferguson (PC) 4635
William Werbiski (NDP) 2151
Sid Lachter (L) 662

Inkster:

(incumbent)Sidney Green (NDP) 5175
Barrie Jones (PC) 2711
Barry Krawchuk (L) 934

Kildonan:

(incumbent)Peter Fox (NDP) 5658
James Hanson (PC) 4651
Norman Stapon (L) 929

Lac Du Bonnet:

(incumbent)Samuel Uskiw (NDP) 5037
John Vaags (PC) 3795
Robert Dyne (L) 515

Lakeside:

(incumbent)Harry Enns (PC) 3987
Phillip Schwarz (NDP) 1494
Douglas Clifford (L) 1034

La Verendrye:

(incumbent)Robert Banman (PC) 4914
Alphonse Fournier (NDP) 1601
Robert Rempel (L) 924

Logan:

(incumbent)William Jenkins (NDP) 2956
Rita Serbin (PC) 1449
Piercy Haynes (L) 578

Minnedosa:

(incumbent)Dave Blake (PC) 3912
John Martens (NDP) 2311
Albert Moad (L) 474
C.V. Hutton (SC) 272

Morris:

(incumbent)Warner Jorgenson (PC) 4484
Alphonse Lenz (NDP) 1152
Donald Macgillivray (L) 516

Osborne:

Gerald Mercier (PC) 3803
(incumbent)Ian Turnbull (NDP) 3707
Gilbert Paul (L) 655
Larry Johnston (RWL) 47

Pembina:

Donald Orchard (PC) 5214
Vic Epp (L) 1141
Marianne Martin (NDP) 1117

Portage la Prairie:

Lloyd Hyde (PC) 3552
Peter Swidnicki (NDP) 2067
Hugh Moran (L) 1893

Radisson:

Abe Kovnats (PC) 4535
(incumbent)Harry Shafransky (NDP) 3757
Evelyne Reese (L) 1394

Rhineland:

(incumbent)Arnold Brown (PC) 3610
Jacob Heinrichs (NDP) 1001
Ray Hamm (L) 943
Jacob Froese (SC) 813

Riel:

(incumbent)Donald Craik (PC) 10412
Doreen Dodick (NDP) 6427
Charles Greene (L) 2539

River Heights:

(incumbent)Sidney Spivak (PC) 6175	
David Walker (L) 1662
Jill Oliver (NDP) 1091

Roblin:

(incumbent)Wally McKenzie (PC) 3291
Kenneth Mikolayenko (NDP) 2351
Joe Andronyk (L) 410

Rock Lake:

(incumbent)Henry Einarson (PC) 4243
Ronald Devos (L) 1167
Eric Irwin (NDP) 1029

Rossmere:

(incumbent)Edward Schreyer (NDP) 9246		
Henry Krahn (PC) 8516
Brian Norris (L) 680

Rupertsland:

(incumbent)Harvey Bostrom (NDP) 2141
George Weiss (PC) 1625
Norman Gunn (L) 741

St. Boniface:

(incumbent)Laurent Desjardins (NDP) 4266
Peter Poitras (PC) 1833
George Ricard (L) 1699

St. George:

(incumbent)Bill Uruski (NDP) 3103
Albert Rohl (PC) 2568
Duncan Geisler (L) 369

St. James:

(incumbent)George Minaker (PC) 5199
Curtis Nordman (NDP) 2853
John Wilson (L) 749

St. Johns:

(incumbent)Saul Cherniack (NDP) 3845
John Borger (PC) 1892
Myroslaw Tracz (L) 733
Don Plowman (Comm) 81

St. Matthews:

Len Domino (PC) 3119
(incumbent)Wally Johannson (NDP) 2995
Roy Yerex (L) 459
Richard Stonyk (SC) 72

Ste. Rose:

(incumbent)A.R. Pete Adam (NDP) 2611
Arthur Erickson (PC) 1830
John Fleming (L) 1219

Selkirk:

(incumbent)Howard Pawley (NDP) 5519
Tom Denton (PC) 4452
Edward Motkaluk (L) 573

Seven Oaks:

(incumbent)Saul Miller (NDP) 7597
Carl Zawatsky (PC) 6777
Sue Juravsky (L) 798
Charles Watson (Comm) 70

Souris-Killarney:

Brian Ransom (PC) 4519
Howard Nixon (NDP) 1500
Jean Strath (L) 1207

Springfield:

Bob Anderson (PC) 5843
(incumbent)Rene Toupin (NDP) 3995
Rita Roeland (L) 700

Sturgeon Creek:

(incumbent)Frank Johnston (PC) 7407
Don Simpson (NDP) 2655
Peter Moss (L) 1736

Swan River:

Douglas Gourlay (PC) 3909
Leonard Harapiuk (NDP) 3179

The Pas:

(incumbent)Ron McBryde (NDP) 3471
Percy Pielak (PC) 1965
Edwin Jebb (L) 714

Thompson:

Ken MacMaster (PC) 3947
(incumbent)Ken Dillen (NDP) 3031
Oliver Monkman (L) 283

Transcona:

Wilson Parasiuk (NDP) 6474
Tony Leonard (PC) 4749
Douglas Dennison (L) 767

Virden:

(incumbent)Morris McGregor (PC) 3669
Edward Arndt (NDP) 1635

Wellington:

Brian Corrin (NDP) 3591
Geoff Dixon (PC) 2376
Mario Santos (L) 591

Winnipeg Centre:

(incumbent)Bud Boyce (NDP) 2217
Philip Lee (PC) 1587
Ken Wong (L) 727

Post-election changes

Rossmere (Edward Schreyer appointed Governor-General of Canada, December 7, 1978), October 16, 1979:

Victor Schroeder (NDP) 6191
Harold Piercy (PC) 5961
E.J. Sandy Clancy (L) 523
Linda J. Penner (WDP) 39
Manuel Gitterman (M-L) 21

River Heights (res. Sidney Spivak, April 12, 1979), October 16, 1979:

Gary Filmon (PC) 3473
Jay Prober (L) 2477
Don Jewison (NDP) 697
William Hawryluk (WDP) 19

Fort Rouge (res. Lloyd Axworthy, April 6, 1979), October 16, 1979:

June Westbury (L) 2659
Vic Savino (NDP) 2291
Julian Hugh McDonald (PC) 1830

Sidney Green (NDP) changed his party affiliation to Independent NDP on December 4, 1979.

Robert Wilson was expelled from the Progressive Conservative caucus on November 20, 1980, and from the Progressive Conservative party on November 28, 1980.  On June 17, 1981, he was expelled from the legislature, having been sentenced to seven years in prison.

Ben Hanuschak (NDP) became an Independent MLA on February 26, 1981.  On February 27, 1981, Bud Boyce left the NDP caucus.

On March 3, 1981, Green, Hanuschak and Boyce announced their membership in the new Progressive Party of Manitoba.

See also

 List of Manitoba political parties

References

Further reading 
 

1977 elections in Canada
1977
1977 in Manitoba
October 1977 events in Canada